The 1994 Norwegian Football Cup Final was the 89th final of the Norwegian Football Cup. It was played on 23 October 1994 at Ullevaal Stadion, in Oslo, Norway.
The final was contested between Molde and Lyn. Molde won the game 3–2 and won their first title. This was Molde's 3rd cup final, while Lyn traveled to Ullevaal for the 13th time. The winner earned a place in the 1995–96 UEFA Cup Winners' Cup.

Match

Details

See also
1994 Norwegian Football Cup
1994 Tippeligaen
1994 1. divisjon

References

1994
Molde FK matches
Football Cup
Sports competitions in Oslo
October 1994 sports events in Europe
1990s in Oslo